Zygmunt Kawecki (born 6 November 1942) is a Polish fencer. He competed in the team sabre events at the 1968 and 1972 Summer Olympics.

References

1942 births
Living people
Polish male fencers
Olympic fencers of Poland
Fencers at the 1968 Summer Olympics
Fencers at the 1972 Summer Olympics
Fencers from Warsaw